The Bishop of Middleton is an episcopal title used by a suffragan bishop of the Church of England Diocese of Manchester, in the Province of York, England. The title takes its name after the town of Middleton in Greater Manchester; the See was erected under the Suffragans Nomination Act 1888 by Order in Council dated 10 August 1926. The suffragan has oversight of the archdeaconries of Manchester and Rochdale.

List of bishops

References

External links
 Crockford's Clerical Directory - Listings

 
Middleton
Bishop of Middleton